This is a list of Portuguese television related events from 2004.

Events
2 January - Nuno Norte, wins the first series of Ídolos.
5 January - RTP2 is rebranded as :2.
25 January - Sofia Vitória wins the second series of Operação triunfo.
31 March - Radiodifusão Portuguesa and Radiotelevisão Portuguesa merge to become Rádio e Televisão de Portugal. At the same time, RTP1 gets a new logo.
31 May - NTV is rebranded as RTPN.
18 October - SIC Sempre Gold is rebranded as SIC Comédia.

Debuts

Television shows

2000s
Ídolos (2003–2005, 2009–present)
Operação triunfo (2003–2011)

Ending this year

Births

Deaths